Rampi is a language of Central and South Sulawesi, Indonesia.

Classification
Rampi is classified as a Kaili–Pamona language by Ethnologue 23. Zobel (2020) classifies Rampi as a separate branch coordinate to South Sulawesi and Celebic.

References

Kaili–Pamona languages
Languages of Sulawesi